The Battles of Monte Grappa were a series of three battles which were fought during World War I between the armies of the Austro-Hungarian Empire and the Kingdom of Italy for control of the Monte Grappa massif, as it covered the left flank of the Italian Piave front.

The first of these battles became the most famous as it brought the Austrian advance to a halt following the Austrian summer offensive of 1917. The Italian Chief of the general staff general  Luigi Cadorna had ordered to construct fortified defenses on the Monte Grappa summit to make the mountain an impregnable fortress. When the Austrian summer offensive of 1917 routed the Italians, Cadorna's foresight saved Italy from total defeat, as the Austrians, with help from the German Army's Alpenkorps failed to take the mountain's summit during the first battle of Monte Grappa from November 11, 1917, to December 23, 1917. Thus, the Italian front along the Piave river was stabilized and, although the Austrians could see Venice from their positions, they would never reach it. Italian casualties totaled 12,000 and Austrian casualties 21,000.

The second battle of Monte Grappa was complementary to the wider Austrian summer offensive of 1918, which was the last offensive operation of the Austro–Hungarian Army in World War I.

The third battle of Monte Grappa started on October 24, 1918, as part of the final Italian offensive of the war, when 9 Italian divisions attacked the Austrian positions on Monte Grappa. The Austrians answered by increasing their forces on the mountain from 9 to 15 divisions and thus committing all remaining reserves. But the worn down Austrian Army began a general retreat on October 28, when Czechoslovakia declared independence from Austria-Hungary.

Popular culture
Monte Grappa appears in Electronic Arts' 2016 first-person shooter video game Battlefield 1 as a multiplayer map. The map is set during the final Italian offensive in the Third Battle of Monte Grappa pitting Austro-Hungarian forces against the Kingdom of Italy. The map is part of the "Iron Walls" operation set during the 1918 Italian offensive. The map also appears in the game as part of the singleplayer campaign under the name Avanti Savoia!

See also
Monte Grappa

References

External links 
 Monte Grappa

Battles of World War I involving Austria-Hungary
Battles of World War I involving Italy